Claire Szabó is a New Zealand chief executive officer and was president of the New Zealand Labour Party from 2019 to 2022.

Biography
Her father came to New Zealand as a refugee from Hungary in 1956 following the Hungarian Uprising, her mother was a nurse. She grew up in Papakura in a council house.

After finishing her high school education at Diocesan School for Girls in Auckland, she studied music at the University of Auckland and later gained degrees at Trinity College Dublin in Education Management, Victoria University of Wellington in Commerce and Administration and Harvard University in Public Administration.

In 2006, aged 27, she became the chief executive officer of English Language Partners New Zealand. In 2013, she became the chief executive officer of Habitat for Humanity New Zealand. In 2010, she was both named young executive of the year and won the New Zealand Institute of Management award.

She was defeated by the incumbent, Maggie Barry of National Party by a margin of 16,503 votes. On 30 November 2019, she was elected President of the Labour Party following the resignation of Nigel Haworth earlier that year.

In 2021, Szabó was appointed to the board of the New Zealand Symphony Orchestra, alongside Chris Finlayson.

On 17 June 2022, Szabó announced that she will not seek re-election to the Labour Party presidency at the November 2022 annual conference, and will end her tenure then. She told The New Zealand Herald that she has reflected on standing for Parliament again at the 2023 general election, but said "I know definitively it's too early to make a decision." She was succeeded by former Deputy Mayor of Wellington Jill Day at the party's conference in November 2022.

She was unsuccessful with list MP Ibrahim Omer winning the selection contest.

Personal life
She is married to Rowan Johnston, a choir conductor, and has two children.

Szabó speaks fluent Hungarian, the mother tongue of her father.

Notes

Living people
New Zealand people of Hungarian descent
University of Auckland alumni
Victoria University of Wellington alumni
New Zealand chief executives
Unsuccessful candidates in the 2014 New Zealand general election
New Zealand Labour Party politicians
21st-century New Zealand women politicians
21st-century New Zealand politicians
New Zealand feminists
Alumni of Trinity College Dublin
Harvard Kennedy School alumni
Year of birth missing (living people)